Enigma is a name used by two supervillains published by DC Comics. The character first appeared in Teen Titans (vol. 3) #38 and was created by Geoff Johns and Tony Daniel. A villain in Trinity has also used the name where he turns out to be the Anti-Matter Universe version of Riddler that formerly went by the name Quizmaster.

A different variation of Enigma named Evelyn Rhyme appeared in the second season of the Arrowverse series Batwoman portrayed by Laura Mennell.

Fictional character biography

First Enigma

Not much is known about Enigma. She briefly joined the Teen Titans after Infinite Crisis, but like most of the members during that time she left. During this period, she was known as the Riddler's Daughter and seemed to be friends with Duela Dent. She is as talented at riddling as her father, throwing in some jokes from time to time. Enigma also wields a question mark-shaped cane as a weapon.

One Year Later, she is a member of Deathstroke's villainous Titans East, now known as Enigma. During a battle, she says to Dent "Wait'll dear old daddy gets a load of us!", implying that they may be sisters, or at least in Duela's mind they are. Enigma and Duela later psychologically tortured Raven inside a hall of mirrors. There, she revealed that she joined Titans East as a way of getting her father, the Riddler, to accept her.

It is revealed that the Joker's daughter is actually the daughter of the Jokester of Earth-3 and was part of the Riddler Family. In Enigma's first post-Teen Titans appearance, the main DC Universe Riddler confirms Enigma to be his daughter.

She later appeared alongside Riddler while fighting Batman. At the story's conclusion in Batman #712, the Riddler asks her, "What's purple and green and bleeds profusely?" Enigma's response is cut short by her scream.

Anti-Matter Universe version
In issue #1 of the Trinity miniseries, a mysterious man, whose face is half-obscured by a metal mask and who is wielding a powerful staff, joins forces with Morgaine Le Fey. His true name is unknown, but he takes the moniker "Enigma", from what Le Fey initially called him. Along with Morgaine, he plans to conquer the Keystone Universe, a.k.a. New Earth, the current mainstream DC Universe, by forcibly integrating the personality of the Trinity, the group formed by Superman, Wonder Woman and Batman, and collecting artifacts related to their personal origins.

The costume and theme are suggestive of the Riddler, who often goes by the alias Edward Nigma/Edward Nygma (although the half-mask is also suggestive of Batman villain Two-Face as it appears Enigma's face is scarred in the same way as his is), but Enigma's true identity is deliberately kept a secret until later in the series.

Approaching to the revelation, several clues are scattered throughout the miniseries: the Riddler claims to recognize the modus operandi of Enigma as his own, therefore asking Dick Grayson more time to exculpate himself. Morgaine, feeling Edward Nygma's life-force while he was at Madame Zodiac's mansion, claims that Riddler and Enigma share the same life-force, or a similar one. Enigma seems to have a personal connection to the Anti-Matter Earth, as evidenced by an emotional outburst when Despero suggests conquering it. This is confirmed when Enigma teleports himself to a base orbiting the Anti-Matter Earth.

Eventually, Enigma is unmasked when he attempts to sap Superman's powers via red sunlight radiation, but reversed in wavelength, which is ineffective over a being of New Earth; this spurs Superman into scanning Enigma's body with his X-ray vision, confirming that he is the Anti-Matter Earth's Riddler. His backstory is later recounted: As the Quizmaster, Edward Nashton had formed the Justice Underground to challenge the Crime Syndicate of America's superiority. Eventually, Nashton's face was burned by Ultraman's heat vision, with his wife and infant son killed and his daughter's body nearly destroyed. In retaliation, Nashton set out to change the Anti-Matter Universe, using the power of the Trinity to do so. Enigma and his allies successfully steal the Trinity's power, only for them to return as godlike beings. Enigma realizes that what they received was not the totality of the power they could have accrued and he devises a plan to complete this power, bickering with Morgaine over her usage of power (she had thoughtlessly destroyed most of Europe in her lashing out against the world). Ultimately, their second attempt fails when the godlike Trinity returns and Morgaine strikes a deal with Krona, hoping to gain his power by giving him the living soul of Earth, in return for the human soul within Enigma's robotic aide, S.P.H.E.R.E., the soul of Enigma's daughter, to replace it, with Morgaine holding her power over her. Enigma refuses and attacks Morgaine and Krona, only for S.P.H.E.R.E. to send him to the safety of the Anti-Matter Universe. Enigma returns, having gained the aid of the Crime Syndicate, to help defeat Krona. When the Earth's soul is released, it rejects Krona and restores Enigma's daughter to life, fusing her soul with that of Krona's Void Hound. When the conflict is over, the two return to the Anti-Matter Universe, hoping to give its inhabitants hope.

Other characters named Enigma
There were other characters called Enigma:

Enigma was the name of an unnamed criminal that fought Blue Beetle and Question.

In Vertigo Comics, there is a superhero that calls himself Enigma.

In other media

A different version of Enigma appears in Batwoman portrayed by Laura Mennell. This version is a hypnotist who is a mutual associate of Safiyah Sohail and Black Mask and also operates as a therapist under the alias of Dr. Evelyn Rhyme. She was first mentioned in a flashback seen in the episode "It's Best You Stop Digging" where Safiyah had Enigma erase some of Beth Kane's memories as well as create her "Alice" persona. Enigma makes her debut in the episode "Rule #1". While asking Black Mask to let her work in private due to sympathizing Kate Kane's condition, Enigma gets ready to erase Kate's Memory. In the episode "Time Off for Good Behavior", Enigma as Dr. Rhyme works as a Snakebite drug consultant and oversees Jacob Kane's therapy after he was chloroformed and injected with the Snakebite drug. Alice plans to confront Enigma so that she can take away the memory of the one who caused Kate's "death" and enlists Julia Pennyworth for help. Julia confronts Enigma only for her to get injected with a chemical from Enigma's cane. In the episode "Arrive Alive", Enigma finds Alice in her office and does a session with her when she wants Enigma to get rid of her memories of Kate Kane. During this trance Enigma puts her through, Alice keeps seeing visions of a young Kate Kane and Ocean. The real Ocean crashes the session and engages Alice until Enigma quotes "Mockingbird Anew" which restores their memories while allowing Enigma to get away. In the episode "Initiate Self-Destruct", Enigma finishes up on Kate and hypnotizes her into being Circe Sionis. In the episode "And Justice For All", Alice visited Enigma again and suspends her from the ceiling when she asks her how to undo the brainwashing she did to Kate. Enigma states that she will need a personal item of Kate. After getting the keys to Kate's motorcycle, Enigma states that a password needs to fully undo the brainwashing as the motorcycle keys would be needed to trigger a memory. When Alice starts to asks for the password, Enigma's neck is snapped by Ocean much to the dismay of Alice as Ocean stated that Kate would put her back in Arkham Asylum. In "Armed and Dangerous", Ocean disposed of Enigma's body while mentioning to Alice that her cane is like Riddler's cane.

Notes

References

External links
 

DC Comics female supervillains
DC Comics television characters
Comics characters introduced in 2006
Characters created by Geoff Johns
Characters created by Tony S. Daniel